Angelique Gerber (born 16 April 1983) is a South African actress who was born, lives and works in Johannesburg although she stayed in Canada from 2001 to 2002 for the shooting of Disposable Life. She attended Hoërskool Hugenote in Springs. She is best known for her part in 7de Laan as Clara but also had a significant role in the 2002 Canadian film Disposable Life playing the role of Emily.  In the South African soap opera 7de Laan, she portrays Clara, a young girl from Bucharest, Romania, who speaks broken Afrikaans and sometimes struggles to express herself properly.

She also hosted the latest series of Boer soek 'n vrou on KykNet.

References

External links 
 
 http://www.7delaan.co.za

South African soap opera actresses
Afrikaner people
South African people of German descent
1983 births
Living people